The 1912 Giro di Lombardia was the eighth edition of the Giro di Lombardia cycle race and was held on 27 October 1912. The race started in Milan and finished in Sesto San Giovanni. The race was won by Carlo Oriani.

General classification

References

1912
Giro di Lombardia
Giro di Lombardia